Samuel Walker was an American football coach.  He was the fifth head football coach at the Virginia Military Institute (VMI), serving for three seasons, from 1900 to 1902, and compiling a record of 11–7–3.

Head coaching record

References

Year of birth missing
Year of death missing
VMI Keydets football coaches
University of Pennsylvania alumni